WNRA-LP (94.5 FM, "The Voice of The Shoals") is a radio station licensed to serve Hawk Pride, Alabama. The station is owned by NAHF Inc. It airs a heavy schedule of local news, traffic, and weather information.

The station was assigned the WSHF-LP call letters by the Federal Communications Commission on February 17, 2014.

The WSHF call letters were originally assigned to AM 1380 in Sheffield, owned by Daylight Broadcasting. This first WSHF was founded by Dick Biddle, who surrendered the station's license to purchase WOWL 1240 in 1952. The WSHF call letters were later used by AM 1290 in Sheffield from 1963 to 1985, when it became WHCM.

In 2014, the WSHF calls were resurrected for use on 92.3 FM, a station which originally signed on the air in Muscle Shoals on October 31, 2007. The station rebroadcast WLAY AM 1450's all-Muscle Shoals music format until 2012. During that time, Licensee URBan Radio Broadcasting dropped the WLAY call letters in favor of positioning the combo as "1450 & 92.3 The Sound." URBan lost the license for 92.3 FM in 2012, and AM 1450 went silent in December 2014. With WSHF 92.3 FM's sign-on in June 2015, the station continued a tradition of broadcasting that dates all the way back to November 1933 when 1450's predecessor WNRA 1420 signed on the air in Sheffield.

On October 1, 2019, WSHF-LP announced it would move up the FM dial from 92.3 to 94.5 FM. The station cited continued interference from a co-channel station in Tennessee as the reason for its move up the FM dial.

The station changed its call sign to WNRA-LP on July 16, 2022.

References

External links
WNRA-LP official website

NRA-LP
Variety radio stations in the United States
Colbert County, Alabama
Radio stations established in 2015
2015 establishments in Alabama